Earl Alexander Rose (born September 5, 1946) is an American composer, pianist, arranger, and conductor. In addition to writing scores for film and television, he has also written several well-known Pop and R&B songs. His film scores include Always at the Carlyle, Johnny Carson: King of Late Night, a PBS American Masters presentation, and the Peabody Winning documentary, Inventing L.A.: The Chandlers and Their Times.

Early life 
Rose was born and raised in New York City and began taking music and piano lessons at the age of seven. He attended and graduated from the Mannes College of Music with a major in piano in 1970, having studied with Frances Dillon and Edith Oppens. During his second year of college, he studied at the Vienna Academy of Music. He also studied conducting at the Juilliard School.

Life and career 
Rose began his composing and conducting career while still in college in the late 1960s, as assistant music conductor for NBC's The Tonight Show starring Johnny Carson, when the show was based in New York. He continued a part-time affiliation with the show until Carson's departure in 1992. Beginning in 1976, one of his first television composing credits was co-writing songs with lyricist Judy Spencer for the CBS television series, Captain Kangaroo. In 1981, he composed the score for the television movie, Thin Ice, and in 1986, he wrote for ABC television's Dick Cavett Show. Rose was the composer for ABC television's Ryan's Hope series between 1983 and 1989. He also wrote for ABC's series All My Children from 1990 to 1995.

Beginning in 2002, Rose composed scores for over a dozen History Channel and A&E Television documentaries and mini-series, including Masada, Wake Island: Alamo of the Pacific, The Presidents, Remember the Alamo, and In The Shadow Of Cold Mountain. In 1996, he began composing scores for documentary films written and directed by Peter Jones. These include Ballyhoo: The Hollywood Sideshow, Stardust: The Bette Davis Story, Inventing L.A.: The Chandlers and Their Times, and Johnny Carson: King of Late Night.

His music has been featured on TV shows such as American Woman, Shameless, The Brave, The Magicians, Pan Am, The West Wing, ER, Sex and The City, and many others. In 2008, he was the pianist for the TV special, A Colbert Christmas: The Greatest Gift of All, accompanying Elvis Costello, Jon Stewart and Stephen Colbert.

Rose's other film score credits include Mad Dog Time, and original music featured in New Year's Eve, About Schmidt, White Oleander, and Gunshy. He wrote the song arrangements for The Object of My Affection.

Rose's songwriting and recording credits include co-writing "Right From the Heart", recorded by Johnny Mathis, "Every Beat of My Heart", co-written and recorded by Brian McKnight, "I Found Love", co-written and recorded by Peabo Bryson, and the Emmy Winning and platinum-selling song, "Love Is A Gift", recorded by Olivia Newton-John and co-written with Victoria Shaw and Olivia Newton-John.

Rose has received numerous accolades for his music, including 13 Daytime Emmy Award nominations, winning one, and a News and Documentary Emmy Award nomination. He has also won three ASCAP awards for composing one of the five most performed songs on television.

As a conductor and pianist, Rose's guest appearances have included the Pacific Symphony, Jacksonville Symphony, Corpus Christi Symphony, Erie Philharmonic, Lubbock Symphony and the San Angelo Symphony. In addition, during the 1990 to 1991 concert season, he performed in and conducted the Columbia Artist Festival's concert presentation, The Irving Berlin Century, in 106 US cities.

For the past 25 years, he has performed a residency as a pianist in Bemelmans Bar at the Carlyle Hotel in New York City. His score for the feature documentary film Always at the Carlyle features a wide range of styles that reflect the history of the 87-year-old hotel.

Awards and nominations

News and Documentary Emmy Awards

Daytime Emmy Awards

ASCAP Film and Television Music Awards

Film credits

Television credits

Recordings 
As a pianist, Rose has recorded for Gramavision Records, Columbia Records, Varese-Sarabande Records, Piano Disc, Steinway and his own label, Amadeus Music Company. These recordings include Solo, Color, Rhythm and Magic: favorite Songs From Disney Classics, Take My Breath Away, Earl Rose Plays Burt Bacharach, Great Movie Themes, Guys and Dolls, and New Standards (2018).

His soundtrack recordings include Stardust: The Bette Davis Story, Inventing L.A.: The Chandlers and Their Times, Johnny Carson: King Of Late Night, and Always At The Carlyle (2018).

As an arranger, he arranged Audra McDonald's recording of "You Were Meant For Me", featured in the film The Object of My Affection and singer Barbara Lusch's CD Rock Me Sweet.

References

External links
 

Emmy Award winners
1946 births
Living people
Mannes School of Music alumni
Musicians from New York City
American film score composers
American pianists
American composers